Paraplastis is a monotypic moth genus in the subfamily Arctiinae erected by George Hampson in 1901. Its single species, Paraplastis hampsoni, was first described by Swinhoe in 1889. It is found in India.

References

Arctiini
Monotypic moth genera
Moths of Asia